Weintrauboa is a spider genus of the family Linyphiidae. The nearest relatives of Weintrauboa were at one time thought to be in the genus Pimoa.

Etymology
Named after Robert L. Weintraub of George Washington University.

Distribution
Species are known from Russia, China and Japan.

Species

References

 Hormiga, G. (2003). Weintrauboa, a new genus of pimoid spiders from Japan and adjacent islands, with comments on the monophyly and diagnosis of the family Pimoidae and the genus Pimoa (Araneoidea, Araneae)  Zoological Journal of the Linnean Society 139:261-281. PDF

Pimoidae
Spiders of Asia
Araneomorphae genera